Philippe Claudel (born 2 February 1962) is a French writer and film director.

Claudel was born in Dombasle-sur-Meurthe, Meurthe-et-Moselle. In addition to his writing, Claudel is a Professor of Literature at the University of Nancy.

He directed the 2008 film I've Loved You So Long (Il y a longtemps que je t'aime). Much admired, it won the 2009 BAFTA for the best film not in English.

Life
After studying in Nancy, he remained there and for eleven years worked as a teacher in prisons. Contact with his students inspired short stories, novels, and then screenplays. He has said that the experience made him give up his simple opinions about people, about guilt, about the water to judge others. "It's clear to me now that it would have been impossible for me to write a novel like Brodeck's Report or Grey Souls, to make a movie like I've Loved You So Long, if I hadn't been in jail."

Awards
His best-known work to date is the novel Les Âmes grises (Grey Souls), which won the Prix Renaudot in France, was shortlisted for the American Gumshoe Award, and won Sweden's Martin Beck Award. He won the 2003 Prix Goncourt de la Nouvelle for Les petites mécaniques, and the 2010 Independent Foreign Fiction Prize, for Brodeck’s Report, ' his hallucinatory story – almost a dark fairy-tale in which Kafka meets the Grimms – of an uneasy homecoming after wrenching tragedy."

His debut film I've Loved You So Long won the BAFTA Award for Best Film Not in the English Language. Claudel also won the César Award for Best First Feature Film for the film.

Works

Novels
Quelques-uns des cent regrets: roman, Balland, 1999
Le Bruit des trousseaux (2002)
Grey souls (Les Âmes grises) (2003); Librairie générale française, 2006, . Grand prix des lectrices de Elle, Translator Adriana Hunter, Weidenfeld & Nicolson/Phoenix House, 2005, . ; Random House Digital, 2007, 
Monsieur Linh and His Child (La Petite Fille de Monsieur Linh), Translator Euan Cameron, Stock, 2005, ; Quercus, 2011, 
Brodeck's Report (Le Rapport de Brodeck), Translator John Cullen, 2007.
The Investigator (L'Enquête), Paris, Stock, 2010, 278 p., ; Doubleday, 2012, Translator John Cullen, 
Parfums, 2012, Paris, Stock, 224 p.
L’Arbre du pays Toraja, 2016 (The Tree of the Toraja), Translator Euan Cameron, MacLehose Press Editions 2018
Inhumaines, 2017, Stock,
L'Archipel du Chien, 2018, Stock

Films
I've Loved You So Long, 2008, with Kristin Scott Thomas and Elsa Zylberstein
Tous les soleils, 2011, with Stefano Accorsi, Neri Marcorè, Lisa Cipriani, Clotilde Courau, Anouk Aimée
Before the Winter Chill, 2013, with Kristin Scott Thomas, Daniel Auteuil and Leïla Bekhti
A Childhood (2015)

Adaptations
Les Âmes grises, 2005, directed by Yves Angelo, with Jean-Pierre Marielle, Jacques Villeret. Distributed by Warner Bros.

References

External links

 

 
1962 births
Living people
People from Meurthe-et-Moselle
20th-century French novelists
20th-century male writers
21st-century French novelists
Prix Renaudot winners
Prix Goncourt des lycéens winners
Prix Goncourt de la nouvelle recipients
Academic staff of Nancy-Université
French male screenwriters
French screenwriters
French film directors
Filmmakers who won the Best Foreign Language Film BAFTA Award
Knights of the Order of Cultural Merit (Monaco)